Andrew J McGann (August 3, 1925 – February 5, 2008) was an American politician, businessman, and funeral director.

McGann was born in Chicago, Illinois and graduated from Leo Catholic High School. He served in the United States Navy during World War II and the Korean War. McGann graduated from Worshan College of Mortuary Science and was a funeral director in Chicago. He was also involved with the financial business. McGann served in the Illinois House of Representatives from 1983 to 1992 and was a Democrat. He diedat his home in Palm Desert, California after suffering a stroke. McGann also suffered from Parkinson-s disease and diabetics.

Notes

1925 births
2008 deaths
Businesspeople from Chicago
Politicians from Chicago
Military personnel from Illinois
American funeral directors
Democratic Party members of the Illinois House of Representatives
20th-century American politicians
20th-century American businesspeople